The Amazonian motmot (Momotus momota) is a colorful near-passerine bird in the family Momotidae. It is found in the Amazon lowlands and low Andean foothills from eastern Venezuela to eastern Brazil and northeastern Argentina.

Taxonomy and systematics

The Amazonian motmot and the blue-capped (Momotus coeruleiceps), whooping (M. subrufrescens), Trinidad (M. bahamensis), Lesson's (M. lessonii), and Andean motmots (M. aequatorialis) were all at one time considered conspecific. The Amazonian motmot has nine recognized subspecies; they are listed in the "Distribution and habitat" section below.

Description

The Amazonian motmot's plumage varies among the subspecies. The bodies of all are shades of green. All have a long tail that has extended feathers with racquet tips that are green or black. Most have a black eyemask, though their size and shape differ. The central crown is black and surrounded or partially bordered by a blue band. The nominate subspecies has a chestnut nape. Momotus momota ignobilis and M. m. cametensis have more extensive chestnut on the neck and face.

Distribution and habitat

The Amazonian motmot is widely distributed in South America east of the Andes. Nine subspecies are recognized:

Momotus momota momota — eastern Venezuela, Guyana, Suriname, French Guiana, and northern Brazil
M. m. microstephanus — southeastern Colombia, eastern Ecuador, and northwestern Brazil
M. m. ignobilis — eastern Peru and western Brazil
M. m. nattereri — northeastern Bolivia
M. m. simplex — western to west central Brazil south of the Amazon
M. m. cametensis — north central Brazil
M. m. parensis — northeastern Brazil
M. m. marcgravianus — eastern Brazil
M. m. pilcomajensis — southern Bolivia, southern Brazil, and northwestern Argentina

Throughout its range the Amazonian motmot inhabits the interior and edges of humid lowland forest.

Behavior

Feeding

The Amazonian motmot is omnivorous. It has been documented eating insects and other arthropods, small mammals and reptiles, and fruit.

Breeding

Like most Coraciiformes, the Amazonian motmot nests in long tunnels in earth banks. Very little else is known about its breeding phenology.

Vocalization

The Amazonian motmot's song has been described as "a fast, hollow hoo-do" and "a bubbling whOOP-oo". It also makes "a gruff kak", sometimes in a series.

References

Amazonian motmot
Birds of the Amazon Basin
Birds of the Guianas
Amazonian motmot
Taxa named by Carl Linnaeus